Ryan Edwards (born 22 September 1990) is an English rugby union player who recently played for Cardiff Blues on loan from the Bristol Bears as a wing.

Edwards made his debut for the Cardiff Blues regional team in 2017 having previously played for the Bristol Bears and the University of West England.

References

External links 
Cardiff Blues profile

English rugby union players
Cardiff Rugby players
Bristol Bears players
Rugby union wings
Living people
1990 births